John Matthew Patrick Hutton, Baron Hutton of Furness,  (born 6 May 1955) is a British Labour Party politician who was Member of Parliament (MP) for Barrow and Furness from 1992 to 2010 and served in a number of Cabinet offices, including Defence Secretary and Business Secretary. He is a former Chairman of the Royal United Services Institute.

Early life
Hutton was born 6 May 1955, in London, though his family moved to Westcliff-on-Sea, Essex when he was 8. He was educated at Westcliff High School for Boys and Magdalen College, Oxford, where he joined the Conservative, Liberal and Labour Associations and gained a BA in 1976 and a BCL 1978. He worked for a year as a bus driver. For two years he was a legal adviser to the CBI. From 1980–81, he was a research associate for Templeton College, Oxford. He went on to become a senior law lecturer at the Newcastle Polytechnic from 1981–92 before turning back to politics.

Parliamentary career
Hutton first stood for election in the Penrith and the Borders seat in 1987. Two years later, he also failed to be elected as a Member of the European Parliament (MEP) for the Cumbria and North Lancashire region. His election to the Barrow and Furness seat in the 1992 general election saw him replace Cecil Franks as MP with a majority of 3,578. His majority increased to 14,497 in the Labour landslide of the 1997 Election.

After being a part of the Department of Health from 1998, he was made a member of the Privy Council in 2001. In the reshuffle following the 2005 general election (in which his majority fell to just over 6,000), he was made Chancellor of the Duchy of Lancaster and Minister for the Cabinet Office, replacing his close friend and former flatmate, Alan Milburn.

His position in this role was short lived, however. Following the second resignation of David Blunkett, Hutton was appointed as his replacement in the role of Secretary of State for Work and Pensions on 2 November 2005. Hutton was seen as one of Tony Blair's closest supporters but survived in cabinet following Blair's resignation in June 2007 and was moved by new Prime Minister Gordon Brown to be Secretary of State for Business, Enterprise and Regulatory Reform, which incorporated the bulk of portfolios from the now dissolved Department of Trade and Industry, including Energy security issues which many had expected to be ceded to DEFRA.

In September 2006, while discussing the forthcoming Labour Party leadership election, Hutton gave an anonymous quote to BBC journalist Nick Robinson that Gordon Brown would be a "fucking disaster" as prime minister.

He was moved into the role of Secretary of State for Defence in the cabinet reshuffle on 3 October 2008. On 5 June 2009, Hutton resigned his Cabinet position and announced his intention to stand down as an MP at the next general election.

Hutton gave evidence to the Iraq Inquiry about his role as Defence Secretary on 25 January 2010, the same day as his predecessor, Des Browne.

House of Lords
On 27 June 2010, he was created a life peer as Baron Hutton of Furness, of Aldingham in the County of Cumbria, and was introduced in the House of Lords on 1 July 2010, where he sits on the Labour benches.

Later career
In June 2010, it was announced that Hutton had joined the board of US nuclear power company Hyperion Power Generation. The Advisory Committee on Business Appointments stipulated that he should not lobby his former department for 12 months.

It was also announced in June 2010, that the Conservative – Lib Dem coalition had asked him to head a commission into public sector pensions. His initial report was published in October 2010. The final report was published in March 2011. On 19 June 2011, Hutton rejected claims by trade unionists and Labour colleagues that he had been used as a 'stooge' by the government and dismissed speculation regarding his motives for accepting the coalition's invitation.

Hutton became Chairman of the Nuclear Industry Association in June 2011.

Personal life
John Hutton married Rosemary Caroline Little in 1978 in Oxford. They had three sons, Jack, George, and Edward, author of the NHS's 'Urgent Care: Case For Change' project, as well as a daughter, Freya, before divorcing in 1993. John has multiple grandchildren from his sons Jack and Edward, and his daughter, Freya. He married civil servant Heather Rogers in 2004.

He is a member of Cemetery Cottages Working Men's Club, Barrow.

Publications
In 2008 John Hutton's first book was published, a non-fiction book with the title Kitchener's Men – The King's Own Royal Lancasters on the Western Front 1915–18. In it, Hutton gives a "graphic insight into the daily routine and grim reality of warfare on the Western Front for men who were mostly recruited from the Furness area of the North-West.  This was followed in 2010 by 'August 1914, Surrender at St. Quentin'.

He has also co-authored the book 'How to be a minister – a 21st-century guide' with Sir Leigh Lewis.  It was published in September 2014.

Bibliography
 Kitchener's Men, Pen and Sword Books Ltd, 2008,

References

External links

 John Hutton MP Official site
 Rt Hon John Hutton MP – Official profile Cabinet Office
 John Hutton: Electoral history and profile The Guardian
 John Hutton MP TheyWorkForYou.com

News items
 Profile: John Hutton BBC News, 3 November 2005
 Dead Chinook pilots not cleared BBC News, 9 December 2008 – Gross negligence verdicts against RAF crew to stand

|-

|-

|-

|-

|-

|-

1955 births
Living people
Academics of Northumbria University
Alumni of Magdalen College, Oxford
British Secretaries of State
Chancellors of the Duchy of Lancaster
Cumbria MPs
Members of the Privy Council of the United Kingdom
Labour Party (UK) MPs for English constituencies
Labour Party (UK) life peers
Life peers created by Elizabeth II
People educated at Westcliff High School for Boys
People from Westcliff-on-Sea
Secretaries of State for Defence (UK)
UK MPs 1992–1997
UK MPs 1997–2001
UK MPs 2001–2005
UK MPs 2005–2010
Secretaries of State for Work and Pensions
Presidents of the Board of Trade